Zoji La (sometimes Zojila Pass) is a high mountain pass in the Himalayas. It is in the Indian Union territory of Ladakh, Kargil district, Kashmir. Located in the Dras subdivision, the pass connects the Kashmir Valley to its west with the Dras and Suru valleys to its northeast and the Indus valley further east. National Highway #1 between Srinagar and Leh in the western section of the Himalayan mountain range, traverses the pass. As of late 2022, an all-weather Zoji-la Tunnel is under construction to mitigate seasonal road blockages due to heavy snowfall.

Etymology
According to some sources, Zoji La means the "mountain pass of blizzards". The word for blizzards, however, is བུ་ཡུག་ (wylie bu-yug). Based on oral tradition that survived among the local people, Zoji refers to Du-Zhi-la, the goddess of Tibet’s four seasons. The Du-Zhi-lha-mo legend (དུས་བཞི་ལྷ་མོ ) describes her as the wife of Naropa. Through the ages, her name has evolved to Zojila.

The pass is also referred to as "Zojila Pass", which is a misnomer.  The word "pass" is redundant because the  suffix "La/Lah" itself means a mountain pass in Tibetan, Ladakhi, and several other languages spoken in the Himalayan region.

Location

Zoji La is about 100 km from Srinagar, the capital of the Union Territory of Jammu and Kashmir, and 15 km from Sonmarg. It provides a vital link between Ladakh and the Kashmir Valley. It is often closed during winter, though the Border Roads Organisation (BRO) is working to extend traffic to longer periods in winter. The Beacon Force unit and The Vijayak Force unit of the BRO are responsible for the clearing and maintenance of the road during winter. Driving through the pass in winter means driving between thick walls of ice on both sides.

History

First Kashmir War 
During the First Kashmir War, Zoji La was seized by Gilgit rebels in 1948 in their campaign to capture Ladakh. The pass was recaptured by Indian forces on 1 November in an assault codenamed Operation Bison, which achieved its objective primarily due to the surprising use of tanks by Indian forces.  At the time, this was the highest altitude at which tanks had operated in a combat situation in the world.

Zoji La tunnel 

The Zoji-la Tunnel project was approved by the government in January 2018. Construction was inaugurated by Prime Minister Narendra Modi in May 2018. The 14 km long tunnel will reduce the time to cross the Zoji La from over 3 hours to just 15 minutes. When completed, it will be the longest bidirectional tunnel in Asia.

See also
 Machoi Glacier

Notes

References

Mountain passes of the Himalayas
Geography of Ladakh